JNU may refer to:
 Jagannath University, Dhaka, Bangladesh
 Jaipur National University, Jaipur, Rajasthan, India
 Jawaharlal Nehru University, New Delhi, India
 Jeju National University, Jeju, South Korea
 Jeonnam National University, Kwangju, South Korea
 Jinan University, Guangzhou, Guangdong province, China
 Jodhpur National University, Jodhpur, Rajasthan, India
 Juneau International Airport (IATA code JNU), Juneau, Alaska